Archips meridionalis is a species of moth of the family Tortricidae. It is found in Japan.

The wingspan is 16–18 mm for males and 19–23 mm for females.

References

Moths described in 1980
Archips
Moths of Japan